Cafestol is a diterpenoid molecule present in coffee beans.  It is one of the compounds that may be responsible for proposed biological and pharmacological effects of coffee.

Sources 
A typical bean of Coffea arabica contains about 0.4% to 0.7% cafestol by weight. Cafestol is present in highest quantity in unfiltered coffee drinks such as French press coffee, Turkish coffee or Greek coffee. In filtered coffee drinks such as drip brewed coffee, it is present in only negligible amounts, as the paper filter in drip filtered coffee retains the diterpenes.

Research into biological activity 
Coffee consumption has been associated with a number of effects on health and cafestol has been proposed to produce these through a number of biological actions.  Studies have shown that regular consumption of boiled coffee increases serum cholesterol whereas filtered coffee does not. Cafestol may act as an agonist ligand for the nuclear receptor farnesoid X receptor and pregnane X receptor, blocking cholesterol homeostasis. Thus cafestol can increase cholesterol synthesis.

Cafestol has also shown anticarcinogenic properties in rats.

Cafestol also has neuroprotective effects in a Drosophila fruit fly model of Parkinson's disease.

See also
 Kahweol

References

CYP3A4 inhibitors
Diterpenes
Farnesoid X receptor agonists
Furans
Vicinal diols
Pregnane X receptor agonists
Cyclopentanes